Connaught Hospital is the principal adult referral hospital in Sierra Leone.

Connaught Hospital was opened in 1912 by the Duke of Connaught, Prince Arthur. President Kabbah re-opened the hospital on May 5, 2006, alongside the Princess Christian Maternity Hospital (PCMH).

Notable doctors and herbalists
John Augustus Abayomi-Cole – medical doctor and herbalist
John William Campbell (herbalist) – herbalist and brother of the Mayor of Freetown-William John Campbell
Alpha Bundu-Kamara – Chest Physician specialist
 Thaim Buya Kamara – Consultant Urologist and Senior Lecturer and Head, Department of Surgery.

See also
2014 Ebola virus epidemic in Sierra Leone

Notes

Hospital buildings completed in 1912
Hospitals in Sierra Leone
Buildings and structures in Freetown
Hospitals established in 1912
Health facilities that treated Ebola patients
1912 establishments in Sierra Leone